Glory to Gloriana is a 2006 Jamaican movie about the trials and tribulations of one woman, hotelier "Gloria" Eugennie Carroll Minto. The inspirational movie is based on the first half of her autobiography, Gloria to Gloriana. The movie is directed by little known local director Tony Jenkins, and produced by Salt Oil Green Production inc. tells the story of how one woman despite many setbacks and sacrifices is able to overcome her modest upbringing and life circumstances through hard work, determination, and ambition. In the backdrop of the lushness of Jamaica's foliage and its beautiful streams and waterfalls is a story of hard work, debt, adultery, domestic violence, and love triangles.

See also 
 List of Jamaican films

External links

2006 films
Jamaican drama films
2006 drama films
2000s English-language films